The Judge Advocate General of the United States Army (TJAG) is the senior officer of the Judge Advocate General's Corps of the United States Army. Under Title 10 of the United States Code, the TJAG is appointed by the President of the United States with the advice and consent of the Senate. Suitable candidates are recommended by the Secretary of the Army. By statute, TJAG serves a four-year term of officer .

Creation
The position of Judge Advocate General was the brainchild and creation of General George Washington. In a letter to the Continental Congress he wrote, "I would humbly propose that some provision should be made for a judge advocate, and provost-marshal. The necessity of the first appointment was so great that I was obliged to nominate a Mr. Tudor, who was well recommended to me, and now executes the office under an expectation of receiving captain's pay—an allowance (in my opinion) scarcely adequate to the service, in new raised troops, where there are  every day." Congress agreed with Washington and Tudor was formally commissioned as a lieutenant colonel.

U.S. Army Judge Advocates General

See also
General Counsel of the Army
Deputy Judge Advocate General of the United States Army

References

 
United States Army Judge Advocate General's Corps
United States Army
J